The tables below contain General Directorate of State Airports (DHMI) data from 2007 to 2017, on the busiest airports in Turkey by total passenger traffic, including information on international, domestic and transit passengers.

Istanbul serves as one of the largest aviation hubs in the world, with two international airports, handling 80,462,931 passengers in 2014.
Istanbul Airport, which handled about 61 million passengers in 2015, is the third-largest and fifth-busiest international airport in Europe. Istanbul's second-busiest airport, Sabiha Gökçen Airport, which handled over 23.5 million passengers in 2014, is one of the fastest-growing airports in Europe. Planned third airport in Istanbul is being constructed, with a planned capacity of 150 million passengers, to open on October 29, 2018, in northern Istanbul on the Black Sea coast.

At a glance

Turkish airports by passenger traffic

2011 / 2012

2010 / 2011

2009 / 2010

2008 / 2009

2007 / 2008

References

Turkey